Bor-Lyonva is a rural locality (a settlement) in Dobryansky District, Perm Krai, Russia. The population was 252 as of 2010. There are 18 streets.

Geography 
Bor-Lyonva is located 32 km northwest of Dobryanka (the district's administrative centre) by road. Bolshoye Zapolye is the nearest rural locality.

References 

Rural localities in Dobryansky District